Tres Amigos (Spanish "Three Friends") may refer to:

Places
Tres Amigos, river in Juan Castro Blanco National Park

Entertainment
Los Tres Amigos, comic strip by Laerte
Los Tres Amigos, fictional company in TV series Guiding Light (1980–89)

Music
Tres Amigos, album by Los Huracanes del Norte 1995
Los Tres Amigos, album by Luis Miguel 2005
"Tres Amigos", song by Astor Piazzolla
"Tres Amigos", song by Los Huracanes del Norte
"Tres Amigos", tango by Aníbal Troilo, composed by Enrique Cadícamo
"Tres Amigos", 1999 single by French-Japanese jazz duo United Future Organization
Los Tres Amigos, a contemporary latin jazz group formed by Steve Masakowski (guitar), with James Singleton (bass) and Hector Gallardo (bongos)

Other uses
Tres Amigos, brig captured in 1816 by corsair José Joaquín Almeida

See also
Tre Amigos, album by Swedish hip hop band Just D
The Three Caballeros - 1944 Disney film
Three Amigos (disambiguation)
Amigo (disambiguation)